Wrestling World Cup is an international wrestling competition among teams representing member nations of the United World Wrestling (UWW) the sport's global governing body. The cups have been conducted by FILA (the UWW predecessor) every year since the 1973 tournament. The World Cup began as a dual-meet competition for the top teams on each continent, but now features the top teams in the rankings of the previous year's world championships.

Two individual competitions under the same name were held in 1956 and 1958 before establishing the current World Cup comeptition in 1973. beside that UWW had another competition called Individual World Cup as a replacement event for the 2020 World Championships.

Competitions

Men's freestyle

Titles
 15
 15
 8
 7
 2
 1

Men's Greco-Roman

Titles
 12
 7
 6
 4
 3
 2
 1
 1

Women's freestyle

Titles
 11
 6
 1
 1

See also

 World Wrestling Championships
 1956 Wrestling World Cup
 1958 Wrestling World Cup
 2020 Individual Wrestling World Cup

References
General
 Всё о вольной борьбе : 1904-1996
Specific

External links
 UWW Database

 
Wrestling competitions
United World Wrestling
World cups
Recurring sporting events established in 1973
Annual sporting events